Ōmori, Omori, Oomori or Ohmori (written:  lit. "big forest") is a Japanese surname. Notable people with the surname include:

, Japanese seismologist
, Japanese surgeon
, Japanese footballer
, Japanese physical education specialist
, Japanese film director and screenwriter
, Japanese physicist and chemist
, Japanese footballer
, Japanese footballer
, Japanese footballer
, Japanese actor
, Japanese voice actress
, Japanese voice actress, idol and singer
, Imperial Japanese Navy admiral
, Japanese sprinter
, Japanese sprinter
, Japanese World War II flying ace
Shotaro Omori (born 1995), American figure skater
, Japanese Zen Buddhist
, Japanese animator and anime director
, Japanese professional wrestler
, Japanese film director and actor

Japanese-language surnames